Henry Lee Spratt (July 10, 1888 – July 3, 1969) was a Major League Baseball player. He played two seasons with the Boston Rustlers / Braves from 1911 to 1912.  He played as a utility infielder for the team. Prior to playing professional baseball, he attended the University of Virginia, where he was a member of The Delta Chi Fraternity.

References

External links

Boston Braves players
Boston Rustlers players
Major League Baseball center fielders
Major League Baseball outfielders
Major League Baseball shortstops
Major League Baseball second basemen
1888 births
1969 deaths
Baseball players from Virginia
Roanoke Tigers players
Bridgeport Orators players
Nashville Vols players
Montgomery Rebels players
Newport News Shipbuilders players
People from Smyth County, Virginia